Longchamp-sur-Aujon (literally Longchamp on Aujon) is a commune in the Aube department in north-central France.

Geography
The Aujon forms part of the commune's eastern border, crosses the village, flows west through the middle of the commune, then flows into the Aube, which forms the commune's western border.

Population

See also
Communes of the Aube department

References

Communes of Aube
Aube communes articles needing translation from French Wikipedia